Lamá may refer to:

 Lamá (footballer, born 1981), Angolan football goalkeeper
 Lamá (footballer, born 1985), Mozambican football goalkeeper